Mount Mitchell in North Carolina, United States, is the highest peak of the Appalachian Mountains.

Mount Mitchell may also refer to:

Landforms
 Mount Mitchell (Antarctica)
 Mount Mitchell (Queensland), Australia
 Mitchell Hill, above Henry River (New South Wales), Australia
 Mount Mitchell (Alberta), in Jasper National Park of Canada
 Mount Mitchell (British Columbia) on Vancouver Island, Canada
 Mount Mitchell (Oregon), United States
 Mount Mitchell (Washington), United States

Other uses
 NOAAS Mount Mitchell (S 222), an American survey ship

See also
Mount Mitchill, Monmouth County, New Jersey, United States
Mitchell Peak (disambiguation)
 Mount Mitchell State Park, North Carolina, United States